Kamdesh District (Kamdeish District) is a district of Nuristan Province in eastern Afghanistan, sharing a name with the town of Kamdesh. It was originally in Kunar Province and then was moved to the newly created Nuristan Province in 2001.

Boundaries
Since March 2004, Kamdesh District borders on:
 Bargi Matal District to the north,
 Pakistan to the east,
 Ghaziabad District and Nari District of Kunar Province to the south,
 Waygal District to the southwest, and 
 Parun District to the west.

See also
 Battle of Kamdesh, 2009
 Kom people

Notes

External links
 Map of Natural Hazards & Settlements iMMap

Districts of Nuristan Province